The 1982 Liège–Bastogne–Liège was the 68th edition of the Liège–Bastogne–Liège cycle race and was held on 11 April 1982. The race started and finished in Liège. The race was won by Silvano Contini of the Bianchi team.

General classification

References

1982
1982 in Belgian sport
1982 Super Prestige Pernod